Kavita Mahajan (Marathi: कविता महाजन; 5 September 1967 – 27 September 2018) was an Indian author and translator who wrote in Marathi. She is noted for her critically acclaimed novels Brr (2005), Bhinna (2007) and Kuhoo (2011), as well as a non-fiction work Graffiti Wall (2009). She was the winner of the 2011 translation award conferred by the Sahitya Akademi, India's National Academy of Letters.

Early life and education
Mahajan was born in the city of Nanded in Maharashtra. She was the daughter of S.D. Mahajan, the ex-secretary of Marathi Vishwakosh and the granddaughter of the painter Tryambak Vasekar.

Literary career
Mahajan wrote on themes of social emancipation and against discrimination.  Mahajan's book Brr is a collection of stories about women's sarpanch and their experience after the Panchayati Raj system was implemented whilst she wrote Bhinna to describe the lives of those affected by HIV/AIDS. Both books bring out the politics of representation at three levels – one of the institutions like the Panchayats, the corruption in the non-governmental organisations (NGOs), and the intricacies of human relationships. Mahajan's work focuses on political, social, and economic matters rather than maternal or romantic considerations.

Mahajan's 2011 novel, Kuhoo dealt with the relationship between human and nature, and was marketed as a 'multimedia novel'. It came with a DVD containing sights and sounds from nature, including a few animations.  She is also renowned for her poetry, including a collection entitled Dhulicha Awaz.  She was awarded Sahitya Akademi Translation Prize (2011)for her translation Rajai, a collection of 17 short stories by Ismat Chughtai which she translated from Urdu into Marathi.

Mahajan also authored children's literature and published a collection of short stories Joyanache Ranga in 2011. This collection won her the Shashikalatai Agashe Award for Children's Literature in 2013.

Speaking in April 2016 at a programme organised by T.M.A. Pai Chair for Indian Literature at Manipal University, she said: "I am a woman and before that I am a human being. If all are human beings, why is there discrimination? That is a question, which has haunted me from my childhood."

Death 
Mahajan died on 27 September 2018 of pneumonia at the Chellaram Diabetes Hospital.  She was survived by her daughter.

References 

 
 1) 'Bhinn : Ek Akalan'- Purushottam Sadanand Tayde, Akshavangmay Prakashan, Pune  (Maharashtra) First edition  2 october, 2018

1967 births
2018 deaths
Deaths from pneumonia in India
People from Nanded
Women writers from Maharashtra
Marathi-language writers
20th-century Indian women writers
20th-century Indian writers
21st-century Indian women writers
21st-century Indian writers
Recipients of the Sahitya Akademi Prize for Translation